Mimardaris sela, the sela skipper, is a Neotropical species of firetip butterfly in the family Hesperiidae. The species was first described by William Chapman Hewitson in 1866.

Subspecies
Subspecies include:
Mimardaris sela sela (Hewitson, 1866) Colombia
Mimardaris sela aequatorea (Röber, 1925) Ecuador, Colombia, northern Peru
Mimardaris sela chanchamayonis (Draudt, 1924) Peru, Bolivia
Mimardaris sela periphema (Hewitson, 1875) Peru, Bolivia
Mimardaris sela peruviana (Draudt, 1921) Peru

Distribution and habitat
This species is present in Colombia, Ecuador, Bolivia and Peru.

Description
Mimardaris sela is characterised by a large thorax and a conical abdomen. The wings are black, with coppery "windows" on the forewings and various blue stripes on the forewings and hindwings. On the thorax are also present dark longitudinal orange stripes.

References 

Hesperiidae of South America
Hesperiidae
Butterflies described in 1866